Sivakasi taluka is a taluk of Virudhunagar district of the Indian state of Tamil Nadu. The headquarters of the taluk is the town of Sivakasi.

Demographics
According to the 2011 census, the taluk of Sivakasi had a population of 427,072 with 211,932 males and 215,140 females. There were 1,015 women for every 1,000 men. The taluk had a literacy rate of 72.65%. Child population in the age group below 6 years were 21,815 Males and 21,321 Females.

Villages in Sivakasi Taluk
 Alamarathupatti
 Anaikuttam
 Anaiyur
 Anuppankulam
 Boovanathapuram
 Chokkampatti
 V.Chokkalingapuram
 Erichanatham
 Injar
 Kalayarkurichi
 Kariseri
 Kattachinnampatti
 Goundampatti
 Kitchanaickenpatti
 kiliyampatti
 Kothaneri
 Krishnapperi
 Krishnapuram
 Kumilankulam
 Lakshminarayanapuram
 Mangalam
 Melamathur
 Maraneri
 Nadayaneri
 Naduvapatti
 Namaskarithanpatti
 Nedungulam
 Niraimathi
 Pallapatti
 Periapottalpatti
 Poolavoorani
 Pudukkottai
 M.Pudupatti
 Rengapalayam
 Saminatham
 Sengamalanatchiyarpuram
 Sengamalapatti
 Sevaloor
 Sithamanaickenpatti
 Sithurajapuram
 Sukkiravarpatti
 Thatchakudi
 Thevarkulam
 Oorampatti
 A.Thulukkapatti
 Vadamalapuram
 Vadapatti
 Vadi
 Velliahpuram
 Vellore
 Vilampatti
 Viswanatham
 Vendurayapuram
 Zaminsalwarpatti
 Naranapuram
Mangundam Patti

References 

salvarpatti village

Taluks of Virudhunagar district